Prince Karl Aloys of Liechtenstein (in German: Karl Aloys von und zu Liechtenstein) (born 16 September 1878 at Frauenthal; died 20 June 1955 at Frauenthal) was Imperial and Royal Cavalry Master (Rittmeister) until the end of the monarchy of Austria-Hungary and from 13 December 1918 to 15 September 1920 temporarily Prime Minister (Landesverweser) of the Principality of Liechtenstein.

Family 

Prince Karl was a son of Prince Alfred of Liechtenstein and Princess Henriette. He married on 31 March 1921 at the civil registry in Stuttgart Elizabeth, Princess of Urach and Countess of Württemberg. The church wedding was celebrated on 5. April 1921 in Tegernsee.

They had four children:

 Prince Wilhelm Alfred Heinrich Karl Theodor Otto Gero Maria Joseph (Frauenthal, 29 May 1922 - Vienna, 27 November 2006), who renounced his title on 11 July 1950 and took the title of Graf von Hohenau (not to be confused with Wilhelm Graf von Hohenau). He was restored to his titles on 28 October 1980. He married in Kitzbühel civilly on 19 August 1950 and religiously on 21 August 1950 Emma von Gutmannsthal-Benvenuti (Rain bei Klagenfurt, 14 May 1926 - Vienna, 31 August 1984), daughter of Felix Georg von Gutmannsthal-Benvenuti and wife Hermine Krum, and had issue:
 Prince Felix Karl Wilhelm Otto Leopold Maria Graf von Hohenau (b. Graz, 22 May 1951), unmarried and without issue
 Prince Benedikt Ulrich Edmund Vinzenz Josef Maria Graf von Hohenau (b. Vienna, 22 January 1953), married in Vienna on 22 September 1988 Maria Schoisswohl (b. Sankt Pölten, 23 November 1958), daughter of Friedrich Schoisswohl and wife Stefanie Jud, without issue
 Princess Maria Theresia Hemma Elisabeth Felicia Josefa Regina Gräfin von Hohenau (b. Graz, 30 December 1953 - d. Melbourne, 18 August 2011), married civilly in Kensington on 25 July 1978 and religiously in Vienna on 23 September 1978 Aurel Edward Dessewffy de Csernek et Tarkö (b. Greta, New South Wales, 8 April 1950), and had issue:
 Heinrich Dessewffy de Cserneck et Tarkö (b. Greta, New South Wales, 20 November 1979)
 Felicity Dessewffy de Cserneck et Tarkö (b. Melbourne, Victoria, 1 November 1981)
 Alice Dessewffy de Cserneck et Tarkö (b. Melbourne, Victoria, 25 January 1984)
 Marcus Dessewffy de Cserneck et Tarkö (b. Melbourne, Victoria, 21 April 1986)
 Prince Stefan Alois Rupert Barnabas Karl Maria Graf von Hohenau, who took the surname Heildborgh on 16 January 1989 (b. Graz, 11 June 1957), married in Spitz on 25 August 1988 and divorced in 1991 Andrea von Kloss (b. Vienna, 24 December 1958), without issue
 Prince Heinrich Christoph Felix Paul Wilhelm Maria Graf von Hohenau (b. Graz, 20 November 1964), unmarried and without issue
 Princess Maria Josepha Henriette Amelie Florestine Zita Franziska Therese Carola Valerie Elisabeth Ludovika (Hollenegg, 6 July 1923 - Marienfeld, Lower Austria, 5 May 2005), unmarried and without issue
 Princess Franziska de Paula Henriette Marie Amelie Mechthildis Benedikta Petra de Alcantara (Hollenegg, 14 June 1930 - Cologne, 23 April 2006), married civilly in Menden on 9 April 1965 and religiously in Hollenegg on 29 May 1965 Rochus Graf von Spee (Borken, 25 October 1925 - Köln, 30 August 1981), and had issue
 Prince Wolfgang Johannes Baptist Johannes Evangelist Ildefons Franz de Paula Joseph Maria (b. Graz, 25 December 1934), married civilly in Wang on 12 July 1970 and religiously in Isareck on 18 July 1970 Gabriele Gräfin Basselet de la Rosée (b. Isareck, 11 March 1949), and had issue:
 Princess Stephanie Elisabeth Eleonore Maria (b. Salzburg, 12 April 1976)
 Prince Leopold Franz Karl Maria (b. Salzburg, 21 May 1978), married civilly in Hollenegg on 18 June 2011 Barbara Marie Wichart (b. Vienna, 2. September 1979), and had issue:
 Prince Lorenz Friedrich Wolfgang Maria (b. Vienna, 22. September 2012)

He found his last resting place in the burial vault of Vaduz Cathedral.

Ancestry

References 

1878 births
1955 deaths
Princes of Liechtenstein